was a town located in Hiraka District, Akita Prefecture, Japan.

In 2003, the town had an estimated population of 14,394 and a density of 227.32 persons per km². The total area was 63.32 km².

On October 1, 2005, Hiraka, along with the towns of Jūmonji, Masuda, Omonogawa and Ōmori; and the villages of Sannai and Taiyū (all from Hiraka District), was merged into the expanded city of Yokote.

External links
 Yokote official website 

Dissolved municipalities of Akita Prefecture
Yokote, Akita